Crescent is the fourth full-length studio album released by Japanese solo artist Gackt on December 3, 2003. It is conceptually linked to its predecessor Moon and comes with booklets for both records (Moon did not originally contain one). Crescent also features a duet with L'Arc-en-Ciel vocalist Hyde for "Orenji no Taiyou" with whom Gackt co-starred in the 2003 movie Moon Child.

The album is seen as a turning point in Gackt's career. A lyrically emotional and musically varied record, it is often seen as Gackt's strongest release and when he finally mastered his style of poetically romantic lyrics set against an art rock music background.

Release
In the third counting week of December the album reached number five on the Oricon charts, with sales of 75,561 copies. It charted for 11 weeks. Since its release the album has sold more than 250,000 copies, being not certified Gold due to change of criteria, but Platinum by the RIAJ.

Preceding the album release, were released three singles, "Kimi ga Oikaketa Yume", "Tsuki no Uta" and "Last Song". The first single "Kimi ga Oikaketa Yume" reached number two on the fifth counting week of March, with sales of 59,265 copies. In the upcoming two weeks, it was at number nineteen and twenty respectively, with sales of 15,010 and 9,234 copies. It charted for 10 weeks, and sold over 100,000 copies, certified Gold by the RIAJ.

The second single "Tsuki no Uta" reached number three on the fourth counting week of June, with sales of 49,952 copies. In the upcoming week, it was at the number eighteen, with sales of 10,267 copies. It charted for 7 weeks, and was certified Gold by the RIAJ. The third single "Last Song" reached number five on the fourth counting week of November, with sales of 40,745 copies. In the upcoming two weeks, it was at number fifteen and twenty respectively, with sales of 12,116 and 10,029 copies. It charted for 13 weeks, and was certified Gold by RIAJ.

Track listing

Notes 
 The song "Tsuki no Uta" was written as the ending theme song for anime television series Texhnolyze. Throughout the liner notes, "TSUKI no UTA" is printed above the kanji for the song's title as furigana.
 The song "Kimi ga Matteiru Kara" was used as the ending theme song for the first movie in the Mobile Suit Zeta Gundam trilogy Heirs to the Stars, and was re-released as a B-side on Gackts single "Metamorphoze".
 The song "Mind Forest" was used as the ending theme song for the second Zeta Gundam movie "Lovers". The "Mind Forest English ver." was re-recorded by Gackt for the Yellow Fried Chickenz's European tour and was released on live album Attack Of The Yellow Fried Chickenz In Europe 2010 in 2011, while the official YFC version which also featured vocalist Jon was included in single "The End Of The Day" in 2011 and studio album Yellow Fried Chickenz I in 2012.
 The song "Dybbuk" was used as the second ending theme song for the third Zeta Gundam movie "Love is the Pulse of the Stars", and was re-released as a B-side on Gackts single "Love Letter".

Album credits 

 Personnel
Vocals, Piano: Gackt
Guitar, Violin: You
Guitar: Yukihiro “chachamaru” Fujimura
Drums: Toshiyuki Sugino
Drums: Ryuichi Nishida
Guest Voice: Hyde (by the courtesy of Ki/oon Records Inc.)
Bass: Toshimi Nagai
Bass: Ju-ken
Bass: Kolchi Terasawa
Bass: Jun
Violin, Viola: Gen Ittetsu
Cello: Masami Horisawa
Contrabass: Jun Salto
Keyboards & Orchestra arrangement: Shusei Tsukamoto

 Production
Producer: Gackt
Associate Produced: Yukihiro “chachamaru” Fujimura
Executive Producer: Shigenori Nishino (Nippon Crown), You Harada (Museum Museum)
Recorded & Mixed & Pro Tools Edited: Motonari Matsumoto
Assistant Engineer: Michinori Sato (Burnish), Yoshitaka Ishigaki (Burnish), Chie Miyasaka (Burnish), Mitsuru Shibamoto (Prime Sound Studio Form), Satoshi Sasamoto (Prime Sound Studio Form), Katsuyuki Abe (Pradise Studio), Akinori Kaizaki (Pradise Studio), Taro Kuroda (DLT Studio)
Recording Coordinator: Maki Iida (Burnish)
Mastering Engineer: Yoichi Aikawa (Rolling Sound Mastering Stuio)

 Design
Art direction, Design: Jun Misaki
Photographer: Kenji Tsukagoshi

References

2003 albums
Gackt albums